Collins Hill High School is a public high school in Gwinnett County, near Suwanee, Georgia, United States.  The school is operated by Gwinnett County Public Schools.  The only school which feeds into it is Creekland Middle School.

Collins Hill was the biggest high school in Georgia when it first opened in 1994, and has since added . Its student population has grown from its original 1377 to a high of about 4,200, the current count being 3,155.

Charity

Each year, the students volunteer over 27,000 hours toward community service activities, including the Thanksgiving Can-a-Thon, Holiday Hope, and Relay for Life.

Many students participate in community service clubs such as Beta Club, and are active in helping others.  Students are offered many volunteer opportunities throughout the year via the school's Volunteer Center. Four scholarships are available to students for volunteering and getting involved.

Notable alumni
 Brandon Coutu, former NFL football player
 Taylor Heinicke, NFL quarterback
 Matt Lanter, model and actor
 Kyle Maynard, author and athlete
 Maya Moore, WNBA basketball player and Olympic gold medalist
 Travis Hunter, American college football player

References

 "Excellence on the Hill" presentation

External links
 

Public high schools in Georgia (U.S. state)
Educational institutions established in 1994
Schools in Gwinnett County, Georgia
1994 establishments in Georgia (U.S. state)